Lars Bergström may refer to:
 Lars Bergström (ice hockey) (born 1956), Swedish ice hockey manager
 Lars Bergström (philosopher), Swedish philosopher
 Lars Bergström (physicist) (born 1952), Swedish professor of theoretical physics